Derai is a town and municipal corporation in Derai Upazila of Sunamganj District in northeastern Bangladesh, part of the Sylhet Division.

History

Derai was previously known as Babaganj Bazar. It was home to two influential Hindu residents; Jitarāma and Dvidarāma, who renamed the area to Derai Bazar. On 10 December 1892, the Assam Gazette notification #5954 recognised the name of the area as Derai. In 1938, the Nankar Rebellion started in Derai and surrounding areas. Derai was made the headquarters of a namesake thana in 1942 and the capital of the namesake upazila in 1982.

Facilities
There is one Non govt public library Nayla Begum Memorial Public Library.  one governmental orphanage, 30 mosques and 4 haat bazaars. Derai municipality has an average literacy rate of 52.11%, with the town at 41.65%.

Administration
Derai Municipality is subdivided into 9 wards and 29 mahallas. The town consists of 4 mouzas.

References 

 
 

Derai Upazila
Populated places in Sunamganj District
Sylhet Division